The Cavée River is a freshwater tributary of the Rivière Jacques-Cartier Nord-Ouest that flows in the unorganized territory of Lac-Jacques-Cartier. It flows through the La Côte-de-Beaupré Regional County Municipality in the administrative region of Capitale-Nationale, in Quebec, Canada. The course of the river crosses the Jacques-Cartier National Park.

Forestry is the main economic activity in the sector, followed by recreational tourism.

The surface of the Cavée River (except the rapids zones) is generally frozen from the beginning of December to the end of March, but the safe circulation on the ice is generally made from the end of December to the beginning of March.

Geography 
The main watersheds near the Cavée river are:
 north side: Gratia stream, Rivière aux Écorces du Milieu, Métabetchouane East River;
 east side: Jacques-Cartier River, Launière River;
 south side: Rivière Jacques-Cartier Nord-Ouest, Petit lac Jacques-Cartier;
 west side: Métabetchouane East River, Métabetchouane River.

The Cavée river has its source at Rieutard Lake (length: ; altitude: , located in the unorganized territory of Lac-Jacques-Cartier, in the La Côte-de-Beaupré Regional County Municipality This lake receives water from the eastern side of the discharge of a set of lakes (Mérillon, Dugas, de la Rocaille, Hardy, Joug and Dan).

Upper course of the Cavée river (segment of )

  south in a steep valley, to the north shore of Lac Lavigne;
  southwards crossing Lavigne lake and Dahous lake, up to the dam at its mouth. Note: Lac Lavigne receives the discharge (coming from the west) from lakes Gerbec, Ianus, Intermediate, Debous and Jax); it receives from the east the discharge of lakes Millet, from above, Augustin and Nickie; it also receives from the southwest the outlet of Lake Nere;

Lower course of the Cavée river (segment of )

  to the south, up to a bend in the river;
  towards the south by forming a loop towards the east, up to the outlet (coming from the west) of lakes Léo, Petit lac Léo and Bill;
  south to its mouth.

Toponymy 
The toponym "Rivière Cavée" was formalized on December 5, 1968 at the Place Names Bank of the Commission de toponymie du Québec.

Notes and references

See also 

 Jacques-Cartier National Park
 Lac-Jacques-Cartier, a TNO
 La Côte-de-Beaupré Regional County Municipality
 Capitale-Nationale, an administrative region
 Rivière Jacques-Cartier Nord-Ouest
 Jacques-Cartier River
 Rieutard Lake
 List of rivers of Quebec

External links 
 Corporation du bassin de la Jacques-Cartier
 Parc de la Jacques-Cartier
 Canadian Heritage Rivers System

Rivers of Capitale-Nationale